Three boats of the Polish Navy have been named ORP Orzeł (meaning eagle in Polish):

  was an  commissioned in 1939 and lost in 1940
  was a  commissioned in 1962 and decommissioned in 1983
  is a  commissioned by the Polish Navy in 1986 and currently in service with the 3rd Flotilla

Polish Navy ship names